OUBEL or Oussama Belhcen (born March 18, 1991) is a Moroccan pop and R&B singer, songwriter and producer. He started his career in 2006 and sings in Arabic, English and French. After a short career with the Moroccan urban hip hop group MafiaFlow, he has had a solo career with three albums (Ana Wnti (2008), Ryan Belhsen (2010) and Dayman (2012), an EP and a number of singles. He is signed to New Lixus Entertainment label.

Career
He was born in Sidi Yahya El Gharb where his father served with the Royal Moroccan Air Force. Oussama Belhcen was attracted very early to the American culture. At age 9 the family moved to the city Larache on the Atlantic Ocean, where launched his musical career and at age 15 forming a hip hop / rap group MafiaFlow with four of his schoolmates. After one album, they separated.

Adopting the Americanized stage name Ryan Belhsen and after one year of separation of the rap group, MafiaFlow, he released his first R&B song "Nhar Ela Nhar" (Day on Day), which was the debut single from his debut solo album Ana Wnti in 2008. On October 10, 2010, he released his self-titled album Ryan Belhsen. He released a number of tracks in English like "Whatcha Gonna Do", "Never Stop This Love", "It's Over". With his third album Dayman (Always) he reverted to his birth name Oussama Belhcen. His style is R&B music "Gharbi" (occidental) style. He performed at various music festivals getting more fame. In 2015, he returned with his singles "Kolshi Bin Yeddi", "Nehar Lik Wenhar Alik" and in 2016 with "Elmostahil Makainsh Febali".

Discography

Albums
2008: Ana Wnti
2010: Ryan Belhsen
2012: Dayman

Mixtapes
2011: Dayman (The Mixtape)

Singles
2008: Nhar Ela Nhar 
2011: Mehtaj Lik 
2012: Fjenbi
2013: Kinghik
2013: Meghribiya feat. Aklo
2015: Kolshi Bin Yeddi 
2015: Nhar Lik Wenhar Alik
2016: Elmostahil Makainsh Febali
2016: Ghatelqani Hdak 
2016: Bali Dima Meak 
2016: Ida Bghiti Shi Hed (If You Love Someone) 
2016: Khaina 
2016: Bzaf 3lihom

Music videos
2016: Khaina

References

External links

 
 Vevo page

Moroccan pop singers
21st-century Moroccan male singers
1991 births
Living people
People from Larache